Parakkal Abdulla is an Indian politician and former MLA of Kuttiady. He was born on 15 November 1958 at Eramala to  Moithu Haji and  Kunhami. He was also the district committee treasurer of IUML. His wife is Jameela and has two sons and two daughters. He is a businessman and has lived in Doha, Qatar for more than 30 years as of 2016. He is the official candidate of UDF in Kuttiadi constituency for 2021 Assembly elections.

References

Living people
Year of birth missing (living people)
Place of birth missing (living people)
Indian Union Muslim League politicians